Pincher Creek-Macleod was a provincial electoral district in Alberta, Canada, mandated to return a single member to the Legislative Assembly of Alberta from 1993 to 1997.

History
The Pincher Creek-Macleod electoral district was created in 1993, when Pincher Creek-Crowsnest merged with Macleod. In 1997 the riding changed names to Livingstone-Macleod.

The riding was situated in the rocky mountains and foothills of south west Alberta and along the Alberta, British Columbia border.

Election results

1993 Alberta general election

See also
List of Alberta provincial electoral districts

References

Further reading

External links
Elections Alberta
The Legislative Assembly of Alberta

Former provincial electoral districts of Alberta